Francisco Macián Blasco (born 1 November 1929 in Barcelona, died 23 October 1976) was a Spanish animator. In 1969 he patented an animation technique he called "M-Tecnofantasy", which is similar to rotoscopy.

Works

 El mago de los sueños - 1966

References

External links

1929 births
1979 deaths
Spanish animators
Spanish animated film directors
Spanish animated film producers